Daniel Sofer (born 14 January 1988) is an Israeli football player who plays as a defender.

External links 
 

1988 births
Living people
Israeli women's footballers
Israel women's international footballers
Maccabi Kishronot Hadera F.C. players
Women's association football defenders
Israeli Jews